Yambo Records was a blues record label based in Chicago, Illinois. It was founded by arranger and composer Willie Dixon in the late 1960s after he left Chess Records. Yambo Records also had two subsidiary labels, Spoonful and Supreme. The label was based at 7711 South Racine Avenue in Chicago, along with Dixon's related companies Blues Factory and Soul Productions. It was distributed by Summit Distributors in Skokie, Illinois.  Dixon recorded and released his 1971 album Peace? on Yambo.  He also released several singles, including the hit "1, 2, 3, 4" by five-year-old Lucky Peterson. The label closed in the mid-1970s.

Discography

Albums

Singles

See also 
 List of record labels

References

Defunct record labels of the United States
Blues record labels
American independent record labels